Monte León National Park is a federal protected area in Santa Cruz Province, Argentina. Established on 20 October 2004, it houses a representative sample of the steppe and Patagonian coast biodiversity in good state of conservation, as well as several paleontological sites of high value. It runs along  of the southern Argentine Sea coastline.

History 
About 10,000–13,000 years ago, hunter-gatherer groups took advantage of the area's varied coastal environment, full of food resources. The Tehuelche people, descendants of the first settlers, expanded land use, developing a greater exchange with other, farther away groups. The arrival of the first European settlers triggered major changes in the original populations: the gradual increase of product exchange dependency and loss of territory caused migrations towards the west of the province and the incorporation of the original settlers into rural tasks.

In April the governor of Punta Arenas, Diego Dublé Almeyda, sent the gunboat Magallanes with orders of sinking any Argentine vessels in the area. The French boat Jeanne-Amelie, authorized by Avellaneda's administration, was boarded and its crew imprisoned by the Chilean forces, an incident that worsened the bilateral relationship. Two years later Chile once again seized a vessel in Monte León: this time it was the United States' ship Devonshire, and the action put both countries at the verge of war.

Francisco P. Moreno, naturalist and creator of the Argentine National Park System, and the paleontologist Carlos Ameghino explored the area in the late 19th century. The Italian missionary Alberto María De Agostini also visited it in the early 20th century.

The Estancia Monte León belonged to the Southern Patagonia Sheep Farming Company Limited, which exploited it as a sheep farm. It was sold in 1920 to the Braun family, who continued this business until 2006. The extraction of guano was profitable until 1930.

In 1996 Monte León was proposed to be included in the National Park System of Argentina. Francisco Erize, former director of the Argentine National Parks Administration, recommended the project to Douglas Tompkins, a billionaire businessman, environmentalist, and founder of Tompkins Conservation, a conservationist NGO.

In 2000, through the NGO Conservación Patagónica, founded and directed by Kristine Tompkins, the farm land was acquired and transferred by land trust to Fundación Vida Silvestre Argentina, demanding it to be donated to the National Parks National Administration, a process finished in 2002. Finally, on 20 October 2004 the law creating the new national park was sanctioned by Congress, making Monte León the first continental marine park of Argentina.

Description 
Monte León consists of high sandstone cliffs, rock formations, islands, wide beaches interrupted by narrow bays, and sandbars that are uncovered in low tide. The park's coastal sector represents about 1% of the Argentine mainland shoreline.

Climate
Temperatures during the winter months can fall below  while they can exceed  during summer. The park averages  of rainfall per year, which is concentrated in fall and winter.

Biodiversity 

The Patagonian steppe, while barren at first glance, is inhabited by a considerable variety of plants. In 1880, Carlos Spegazzini, the founder of botany in Argentina, identified several hitherto unknown grass species when researching the area as part of a scientific expedition financed by Italy.

Aboriginal people used calafate resin as a sort of chewing gum, a custom that chroniclers linked to the good health and cleanliness of their dentures. The wild thyme is widely used in the local cuisine.
Several other plant species found in the park also have medicinal uses. As is usual for desert climates, harsh winters are often followed by spectacular blooms of colorful flowers.

Monte León is also home to about twenty species of coastal and marine birds: several varieties of penguins (including the Magellanic penguin, of which the park holds Argentina's fourth-largest colony, with about 60,000 individuals), three species of cormorants (the red-legged cormorant, the rock shag and the imperial shag), and large, flightless birds known as ñandús (rheas).

Very large populations of fish roam the cold sea waters. The park is also home to several large mammals, including sea lions (forming populous colonies), southern right whales, pumas and roaming herds of guanacos. The park is the only place in the world where pumas feed on penguins.

References

External links 

 Sitio oficial del Parque Nacional Monte León 
 Monte León National Park at The Conservation Land Trust
 Fundación Conservación Patagónica

Further reading 

 "Monte León National Park" Forward by Carlos Enrique Meyer with essays by Silvia Braun, Claudio Campagna, Kristine Tompkins, William Conway, Francisco Erize, and Patricia Gandini. The Conservation Land Trust, 2013. 

National parks of Argentina
Protected areas established in 2004
2004 establishments in Argentina
Protected areas of Santa Cruz Province, Argentina